Kamlesh Pandey is an Indian screenwriter with more than 30 years' experience in advertising, 20 years in films and 14 years in television. He has won the Filmfare Awards for Tezaab, Star Screen Awards for Saudagar and IIFA Award for Rang De Basanti. He is from Ballia, Uttar Pradesh, and lives in Mumbai.

Career

Advertising 

Pandey started his career in advertising in 1970 with Hindustan Thompson Associates as a Copywriter. After a brief stint at Sista's (now Saatchi & Saatchi) as Copy Chief from 1973–74 and at Grant Advertising Pvt.Ltd. (now Contract Advertising) in 1976 as Head of Creative, he joined Rediffusion Advertising Pvt.Ltd. (now Rediffusion DY&R) in 1976 as Head of Creative Department. Rediffusion became the most successful during his stint from 1976 to 1992.

Pandey has worked with large companies such as Colgate-Palmolive, Maruti, Airtel, BPL, Telco, Exide, Union Carbide, Eveready, and Rajanigandha. He won the Best Copywriter Of The Year Award for four years in succession from its inception in 1978, after which he stopped entering. He was awarded the most prestigious honour in the advertising industry: CAG Hall of Fame 2005.

Film 

Kamlesh Pandey started writing films since 1987 while still in advertising and went on to write various blockbusters; till date he has written over 40 films. He is a Member of Film Writers Association, Mumbai (Membership No.1855), Indian Documentary Producers Association (Membership No. OM/24-97) and Uttar Pradesh Film Development Council. He Has been visiting faculty for teaching Screenplay at Subhash Ghai's Whistlingwoods. Pandey's many films are listed in his biography.

Television 
Pandey embraced television in 1980s while still in advertising full-time. Wrote cult investigative thriller Karamchand for Pankaj Parashar and social teleplays Kachchi Dhoop and Naqab for Amol Palekar.

In 1992, Pandey joined Zee TV as Head Of Programming and helped to make it successful. He designed and defined the look, the style, the language, the flavour, the personality and the software menu of the channel.

Pandey revived traditional Indian game shows like Antakshari and introduced new programs such as Tara, Campus, Banegi Apni Baat, Phillips Top Ten, Zee Horror Show, Shakti, Mere Ghar Aana Zindagi, and Filmi Chakkar.
He left Zee TV in 1995.

Pandey won the Indian Television Academy Award 2007 for the Best Dialogue and Indian Telly Awards 2007 for the Best Screenplay and the Best Dialogue for Virrudh.

Pandey is currently writing Kuch Toh Log Kahenge aired in Sony TV since October 2011.

Filmography
Jalwa (1987)
Tezaab (1988)
ChaalBaaz (1989)
Dil (1990)
Saudagar (1991)
Khalnayak (1993)
Bhagyawan (1993)
Shreemaan Aashique (1993)
Jaan (1996)
Itihaas (1997)
Hameshaa (1998)
Wajood (1998)
Laawaris (1999)
Shikari (2000)
Farz (2001)
Aks (2001)
Janasheen (2003)
Rang De Basanti (2006)
Yuvvraaj (2008)
Jazbaa (2015)

References

External links 

Film directors from Mumbai
Filmfare Awards winners
Hindi-language writers
Hindi screenwriters
Indian advertising directors
Indian lyricists
Living people
Year of birth missing (living people)